= Posterior median line =

Anatomical line along the back

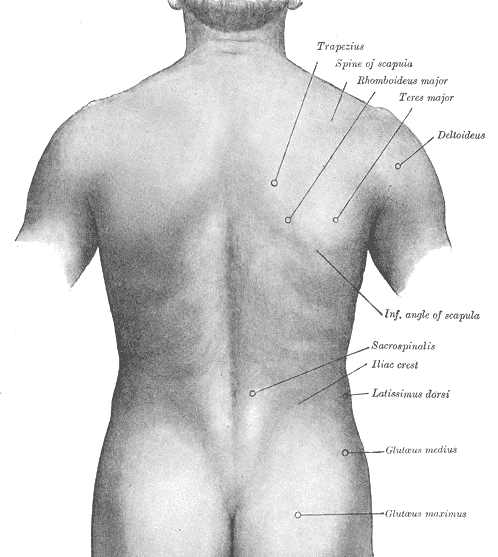
- Illustration of a human back.

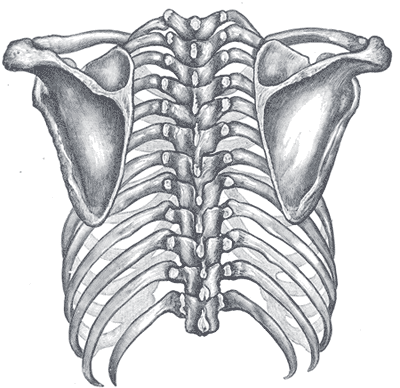
- Posterior view of the thorax and shoulder girdle.

Details

Identifiers
- Latin: linea mediana posterior
- TA98: A01.2.00.022
- TA2: 70
- FMA: 20311

The posterior median line is a sagittal line on the posterior torso at the midline.

A similar term is "vertebral line", which defined by the spinous processes. However, this term is not in Terminologia Anatomica.
